Montgomery County Airpark  is a U.S. public airport located three miles (5 km) northeast of the city of Gaithersburg, in Montgomery County, Maryland, United States.

History

1960s
The airport was built by Silver Spring developer William E. Richardson in 1960, in an area that was then rural. The Montgomery County Planning Board voted 3–2 in favor of rezoning the land to allow the airport to be built. Those in favor on the Board said that Montgomery County "desperately" needed an airport and that the additional industry would help bring in tax revenue, while those opposed said that the airport would destroy the rural aspect of the surrounding area.

Richardson deeded title to the land to Montgomery County, which leased the land back to him to operate the airport. Richardson planned to operate charter flights and an air taxi to National Airport, Baltimore's Friendship Airport, and the soon-to-be-opened Dulles Airport. The airport was dedicated on October 22, 1960. The airport was initially managed by Richardson's son, James E. Richardson, and Richard T. Kreuzburg, a former Capital Airlines pilot. 

After having a simple hangar during its first four years of operation, a terminal building was built in 1964.

2000s
On July 20, 2001, one of the hijackers in the future September 11 attacks, Hani Hanjour, flew to the Montgomery County Airpark from Fairfield, New Jersey, on a practice flight with fellow hijacker Nawaf Alhazmi.

Facilities

Runways 

 Runway 14/32: 4,202 x 75 ft. (1,281 x 23 m), surface: asphalt (32 - right traffic)

Navigational aids 
 WAAS/GPS/RNAV MDA 262 agl
 VOR 155 degree from FDK 109.0 MDA 600 agl

On-field services 
 DC Metro Aviation Services
 Full-service FBO - 100LL JetA
 Hangar-tiedown rental
 Charter operators
 Open Air Charters - Part 135
 Flight schools
 Bravo Flight Training
 Positive Attitude Aviation
 Pilot in Training Flight Academy
 Washington International Flight Academy (WIFA)
 Civil Air Patrol
 Montgomery Senior Squadron
 Food & beverage
 Airport Cafe

Flying clubs
Congressional Flying Club
 Octopus Flying Club
 Inn Flying Club
 TSS Flying Club
TSS Flying Club was formed in 1957 and remains one of the largest flying clubs in the Washington-Baltimore region today. TSS has 65 members and five well equipped aircraft including two Cessna 172 180hp, Cessna 182S, Cessna 182RG, and a Vans RV12 certified light sport aircraft with glass cockpit.

Accidents and incidents
At least 30 plane crashes have occurred at or near Montgomery County Airpark since 1983 

On December 8, 2014, a plane crashed into houses while on approach to Runway 14 at Montgomery County Airpark. Six people died, the three occupants of the plane and three people in the house the plane hit.

On November 27, 2022, a Mooney M20J-201 (N201RF) crashed into a powerline while on approach to Runway 14 at Montgomery County Airpark. Both occupants survived with some injuries but were trapped in the aircraft for several hours.

References

Further reading
Airport Master Record (FAA Form 5010), also available as a printable form (PDF)

External links 

Montgomery County Revenue Authority

Airports in Maryland
Transportation buildings and structures in Montgomery County, Maryland
Buildings and structures in Gaithersburg, Maryland
Airports established in 1960
1960 establishments in Maryland